The Croatia national baseball team is the national baseball team of Croatia. As of the beginning of 2013 in the IBAF World Rankings, they were the seventh-best team in Europe and the 31st men's baseball team overall. The team is controlled by the Croatian Baseball Association, which is represented in the Confederation of European Baseball. Croatia hosted one of the four pools during the first stage of play in the 2009 Baseball World Cup. The official IBAF 2014 end-of-year World Rankings put Croatia 43rd in the world. Croatia joined the Confederation of European Baseball in 1992.

In 2015, Croatia won the B-Level European Championship in Karlovac. They were undefeated in their pool, winning all five games. In the championship game, Croatia defeated Slovakia 6–4 to win the Qualifier for the 2016 European Baseball Championship. Croatia finished in 12th place in the 2014 Euros and were relegated to the B-Level. Croatia competed in the 2019 European Baseball Championship, came in 11th out of 12 teams (beating only Team Sweden), but haven't been relegated because of enlargement of championship to 16 teams. The best result ever Croatia managed on 2021 European Baseball Championship where the 7th place was won in match against Belgium.

Osvaldo Vavra is the President of the Croatian Baseball Association. Božidar Rožman is the Vice President, and Zdenko Ostović is the Secretary General. Kristina Uroić is the Executive Director of the CBA, which is headquartered in the capital city, Zagreb.

2021 roster
The following was the Croatian roster that participated in the 2021 European Championship held in Italy.

The manager of the team are Jake Summers, and the assistant coaches are Michel Ćurić, Damir Karin, Ken Krsolovic and Josip Bozanić.

Tournament results

Baseball World Cup

European Baseball Championship

References

National baseball teams in Europe
baseball